Meshak Munyoro (born 24 August 1958) is a Kenyan hurdler. He competed in the men's 400 metres hurdles at the 1984 Summer Olympics.

References

1958 births
Living people
Athletes (track and field) at the 1984 Summer Olympics
Kenyan male hurdlers
Olympic athletes of Kenya
Place of birth missing (living people)